Bangs House may refer to:

John and Lavina Bangs House, New London, Iowa
Algernon Bangs House, Augusta, Maine
Benjamin Bangs House, Fenton, Michigan

See also
Jens Bang's House